Belda is a village in the Narayangarh CD block in the Kharagpur subdivision of the Paschim Medinipur district in West Bengal, India.

Geography

Location
It has an average elevation of 12 metres (42 feet).

It is located approximately 35 km south of Kharagpur town, 50 km from district headquarter Midnapore and 165 km from the state capital city Kolkata/Calcutta. NH 60 and SH 5 cross at Belda. It is also well connected by railways and also known as 'The Gateway to Odisha'. Thus, Belda plays an important role in connecting eastern India with southern India. Due to its easy access from different parts, it is a good business center.

Area overview
Kharagpur subdivision, shown partly in the map alongside, mostly has alluvial soils, except in two CD blocks in the west – Kharagpur I and Keshiary, which mostly have lateritic soils. Around 74% of the total cultivated area is cropped more than once. With a density of population of 787 per km2nearly half of the district's population resides in this subdivision. 14.33% of the population lives in urban areas and 86.67% lives in the rural areas.

Note: The map alongside presents some of the notable locations in the subdivision. All places marked in the map are linked in the larger full screen map.

Demographics
According to the 2011 Census of India Belda had a total population of 762 of which 386 (51%) were males and 376 (49%) were females. Population in the age range 0–6 years was 75. The total number of literate persons in Belda was 665 (87’27% of the population over 6 years).

Police station
Belda police station has jurisdiction over the Dantan II  CD block.

Transport 
Belda railway station (earlier known as Contai Road) is under the administrative control of the South Eastern Railway. The main train connections include East Coast Express, Sri Jagannath Express and Dhauli express. Computerized Reserved and Unreserved ticketing facility is available here. The major railhead close to the station is Kharagpur Junction Railway Station.

Cultures and festivals 
Belda celebrates most of the common Bengali festivals. Most important festival is Durga Puja, which attracts thousands of people. Kali puja is another popular one. Other festivals includes Saraswati puja, Basanti puja. Dassera and Diwali are popular among the Gujrati communities living in this town.

And most popular Mela of Basanta Utasab.

Satyanarayan Mandir is one of the mandir where Navratri is celebrated with a bright, elegant and traditional dance style called Garba. It attracts Gujaratis from places far as it is still conducted in traditional form and is still pure in devotion of Maa Ambi and also ratha jatra.

Almost all type of religious people stay at Belda. And because of these reason, not only all Bengali festivals, the other religious festivals also happens at Belda grandly like Eid-ul-Fitr, Eid-ul-Adha, Muharram, Mahavir Jayanti, Basanta Utsab etc.

Education

Schools 
Belda Gangadhar Academy
Belda Prabhati Balika Vidyapith
Belda Binapani Primary School
Belda Himansu Sekhar Prathamik Vidhyalaya
Belda Saradamoyee primary School
Belda English Medium School(C.I.S.C.E/I.C.S.E)
Belda Lions School Life & Light
Shivananda Shiksha Niketan
Belda Janaki School
Belda Janaki Hindi Shiksha Niketan [Hindi Medium-Primary School]
Deuli High School
Deuli Sudhir buniyadi Primary School

Colleges 
Belda College: It is affiliated to Vidyasagar University and it provides graduation on many of major subjects and it is also provides post graduation in English and Bengali. Belda College is in the list of top three colleges among V.U colleges.

Notable people
Hemchandra Kanungo- born in Radhanagar he was an Indian nationalist and a member of the Anushilan Samiti.

References

External links
 Website on Medinipur
 

Villages in Paschim Medinipur district